This article presents the discography of American singer-songwriter Stan Ridgway.

Albums

Studio albums

Extended plays

Live albums

Compilation albums

Singles

References

External links
 Official website
 Stan Ridgway at AllMusic
 
 

Discography
Discographies of American artists
Rock music discographies